Welsh Language Music Day is a music festival founded by BBC Radio 1 DJ Huw Stephens. Events take place on the day at its base in Cardiff, as well as previously in London, Swansea, and even as far as Brooklyn and Budapest.

Etymology 
Despite the Welsh language having words for 'music' ('Cerddoriaeth', 'Cerdd' or 'Alaw'), the colloquial term 'Miwsic', borrowed from the English word 'Music', was used instead to promote the event.

Background 

The festival takes place annually in Stephens' hometown of Cardiff, Wales, as well as hosting events in other UK cities including London, Caernarfon, and Swansea. The first Welsh Language Music Day took place in February 2013. Artists who have been highlighted include Mellt, Gwenno Saunders, The Gentle Good, Chroma, Adwaith, Candelas, Meic Stevens, Los Blancos, and Alffa.

Organisations across Wales are involved in the yearly event, including Sŵn, BBC Horizons, Forté Project, Clwb Ifor Bach and Big Fish Little Fish.

Venues 

Events have been held across the UK, including venues in Cardiff as well as:

 Kings Place, London
 Clwb Ifor Bach, Womanby Street, Cardiff
 Castle Emporium, Womanby Street, Cardiff
 St John's Church, Canton, Cardiff
 Blackwood Miners Welfare Institute, Blackwood
 Whitehall, Pwllheli
 Tafarn yFic, Pwllheli
 Y Galeri, Caernarfon
 Clwb Canol Dre, Caernarfon
 Bangor University
 Venue Cymru, Llandudno

Independent events have also been organised by Menter Iaith in the following:

 Conwy
 Maldwyn
 Fflint
 Wrexham
 Sir Dinbych
 Ceredigion

Acts 

During each years' events, organisers research the streaming popularity of Welsh language music acts globally.

The 2018 event found the most popular Welsh artists on Spotify were:

 The Joy Formidable
 Super Furry Animals
 Cate Le Bon
 Catatonia
 Iwan Rheon
 Gwenno Saunders
 Yws Gwynedd
 Bryn Fon
 Al Lewis
 Sŵnami

The survey also found the following artists were most popular on Shazam:

 Catatonia
 Super Furry Animals
 Gwenno Saunders
 Casi
 Yws Gwynedd
 Bryn Fon
 Meic Stevens
 Dafydd Iwan
 Omaloma
 Elin Fflur

See also 

 Culture and recreation in Cardiff
 Huw Stephens
 Music of Cardiff
 Music of Newport
 Music of Wales
 Welsh language

References

External links 

  (English)
  (Welsh)

Welsh Language Music Day
Welsh Language Music Day
Welsh Language Music Day
Welsh Language Music Day
Welsh Language Music Day
Recurring events established in 2013
Winter events in Wales